RQ may refer to:

 RQ series, a reconnaissance unmanned aerial vehicle designator of the United States Defense Department
 Kam Air (IATA designator RQ)
 Puerto Rico (FIPS 10-4 country code RQ)
 Reference Quarterly
 Renaissance Quarterly, a scholarly journal published by the Renaissance Society of America
 Respiratory quotient, used in calculations of basal metabolic rate
 RuneQuest, a role-playing game
 Research question, the formulation of which is often the first step in a research process